Milko Trilov Gaydarski (18 March 1946 – 23 December 1989) was a Bulgarian football defender who played for Bulgaria in the 1970 FIFA World Cup and in the 1968 Summer Olympics in Mexico City where Bulgaria won silver. 

At the club level, Gaydarski played for Spartak Sofia (1962–1968) and Levski Sofia (1968–1977). He won the Bulgarian Cup five times (1968 with Spartak, 1970, 1971, 1976, 1977 with Levski) and the Bulgarian league three times (1970, 1974, 1977 with Levski).

References

External links
FIFA profile
Profile at levskisofia.info

1946 births
1989 deaths
Footballers from Sofia
Bulgarian footballers
Bulgaria international footballers
Association football defenders
PFC Levski Sofia players
First Professional Football League (Bulgaria) players
1970 FIFA World Cup players
Olympic footballers of Bulgaria
Olympic silver medalists for Bulgaria
Olympic medalists in football
Footballers at the 1968 Summer Olympics
Medalists at the 1968 Summer Olympics